Tal Makhlouf (born 31 August 1991) is an Israeli football center defender. He currently plays for Hapoel Ashdod.

External links 
 

1991 births
Israeli Jews
Living people
Israeli footballers
Footballers from Ashkelon
Hapoel Ashkelon F.C. players
Ironi Tiberias F.C. players
Hapoel Kfar Saba F.C. players
Hapoel Ashdod F.C. players
Israeli Premier League players
Liga Leumit players
Israeli people of Moroccan-Jewish descent
Association football defenders